Maciej Janowski (born 6 August 1991 in Wrocław, Poland) is a Polish  speedway rider who is a member of Poland national speedway team.

Career history

2007
Janowski passed speedway licence test (Licencja "Ż") on 7 August 2007 at 16 years old; 5 days later he rode in his first meeting in Polish Ekstraliga (Wrocław vs Rzeszów 48:42). In his first heat, he beat Rzeszów' rider Andreas Messing from Sweden. His fourth meeting was Tournament of Junior National Team Reservs (Turniej zaplecza kadry juniorów). In this meeting he was 4th.

He has won qualification to U-19 Bronze Helmet Final; Janowski was 13th (he was only 16 years old). With Atlas Wrocław he started in European Club Champions' Cup Final - Janowski scored 5 points, but Atlas was last.

2008

In season 2008 (as 17-year-old) he started in Team U-19 European Championship Final. He was the best rider in Poland team (15 points), but Poland was last on home track (Rawicz). In August he won Individual U-21 Polish Championship in Rybnik. In Individual U-19 European Championship Final he was second; lost to Artur Mroczka from Poland. In September he was the best rider in Poland team and he won Team U-21 World Champion title. He was 2nd in Polish Bronze Helmet Final (U-19). His last honour in this season was winning in Polish Silver Helmet Final (U-21). Janowski is a Wrexham fan

He was nominated as 2nd track reserve at Speedway Grand Prix of Poland in Bydgoszcz, but he did not ride any heat. Five weeks later, after re-staged German SGP in Bydgoszcz, Janowski was nominated as first track reserve at 2008 FIM Final Speedway Grand Prix. However, when Niels Kristian Iversen was injured, Janowski replaced him in GP event. He finished 15th and scored one point (0,1,0,0,0), after beating German Martin Smolinski in Heat 8.

Weekly "Tygodnik Żużlowy" (Speedway Weekly) awarded him as Junior of the Year. Speedway Chapter of Main Commission of Speedway Sport (part of the Polish Motor Union) awarded him and Przemysław Pawlicki for one of the best debuts in Polish speedway history.

2009
In 2009 season he rode for Atlas Wrocław (Poland), Rospiggarna Hallstravik (Sweden) and MSC Diedenbergen (Germany). In Sweden he rode in nine matches and scored 4.52 point per match.

He qualified for the Individual Polish Championship Final at MotoArena Toruń as a track reserve. Janowski was unsuccessful in defended his Under-21 Polish Champion title in the final he scored 8 points (3,3,R,0,2) and finished eighth. He won the Bronze Helmet Final, unofficial U-19 Polish Championship, at his home track in Wrocław. He scored a maximum 15 points and he beat Patryk Dudek, Under-21 Polish Champion. On 25 September he was second in Silver Helmet Final, losing to Grzegorz Zengota by two points.

His team Atlas Wrocław did not compete in the Polish Pairs Junior Championship, therefore he was lent to UKS Żaki Taczanów for this competition only. Janowski scored a maximum 18 points in the final and his pair finished third.

On 11 July Maciej Janowski competed in the Individual U-19 European Championship Final and won the silver medal after winning a run off with Martin Vaculík and Artem Laguta. The gold medal was won by Przemysław Pawlicki. Janowski and Pawlicki were the highest scorer for the Polish team in the Team U-19 European Championship Final on 23 August and Poland won U-19 European Champion title. On 5 September in Gorzów Wielkopolski he scored 13 points for Poland, and the team successfully defended their U-21 World Champion title at Under-21 Speedway World Cup. On 3 October will be started in Individual U-21 World Championship Final.

2010
Like his Rospiggarna Hallstravik team-mate, Greg Hancock, Janowski moved to Piraterna Motala before a 2010 season.

On 18 August it was announced that Janowski would join the Swindon Robins in the British Elite League for the remainder of the season. Maciej won the 2010 Polish Under-21 Championship, held in Toruń, scoring a 15-point maximum. Maciej is also riding in the U21-World Cup and was 2nd beating the main rival Maksim Bogdanows in Pardubice.

2011
In 2011, he became the World Under 21 champion.

2012
On 23 December 2011 it was announced that Janowski would be racing for Kings Lynn Stars in the 2012 British speedway season, in the Elite League.

2022
Janowski won the bronze medal in the 2022 Speedway World Championship, after securing 106 points during the 2022 Speedway Grand Prix.

Family
His parents are Piotr and Beata. He has two brothers Wojciech and Krzysztof.

Major results

World individual Championship
2008 Speedway Grand Prix - 29th
2012 Speedway Grand Prix - 23rd
2014 Speedway Grand Prix - 24th
2015 Speedway Grand Prix - 7th (including Latvian grand prix win)
2016 Speedway Grand Prix - 9th (including Danish grand prix win)
2017 Speedway Grand Prix - 4th (including Danish & British grand prix wins)
2018 Speedway Grand Prix - 4th (including Swedish grand prix win)
2019 Speedway Grand Prix - 6th (including German grand prix win)
2020 Speedway Grand Prix - 4th (including Wrocław grand prix win)
2021 Speedway Grand Prix - 5th (including Czech Republic grand prix win)
2022 Speedway Grand Prix - 3rd

World team Championships
2013 Speedway World Cup - Winner
2015 Speedway World Cup - 3rd
2017 Speedway World Cup - Winner
2018 Speedway of Nations - 3rd
2021 Speedway of Nations - runner up
2022 Speedway of Nations - 5th

World U-21 Championships
2008 Team Speedway Junior World Championship - Winner
2009 Individual Speedway Junior World Championship - 5th
2009 Team Speedway Junior World Championship - Winner
2010 Individual Speedway Junior World Championship - 2nd
2011 Individual Speedway Junior World Championship - Winner
2012 Individual Speedway Junior World Championship - Winner

European Championships
 Individual U-19 European Championship
 2008 -  Stralsund - Silver medal (12+3 pts)
 2009 -  Tarnów - Silver medal (13+3 pts)
 Team U-19 European Championship
 2008 -  Rawicz - 4th place (15 pts)
 2009 -  Holsted - U-19 European Champion (15 pts)
 2010 -  Divišov - U-19 European Champion (15 pts)
 European Club Champions' Cup
 2007 -  Miskolc - Silver medal (6 pts) with Atlas Wrocław

Domestic competitions
 Individual Polish Championship
 2013 -  Tarnów - 3rd place (10 pts)
 Team Polish Championship (League)
 2007 - Bronze medal (CMA 1.71 - Atlas Wrocław)
 2008 - 5th-6th place (with Atlas Wrocław)
 Individual U-21 Polish Championship
 2008 -  Rybnik - Polish Champion (13+3 pts)
 2010 -  Toruń - Polish Champion (15 pts)
 2012 -  Bydgoszcz - Polish Champion (14 pts)
 Polish Pairs Speedway Junior Championship
 2009 -  Rybnik - Bronze medal for Taczanów (18 pts)
 Polish Pairs Speedway Championship
 2011 -  Zielona Góra - Polish Champion for WTS Wrocław
 2013 -  Gorzów Wielkopolski - Polish Champion for Unia Tarnów
 Polish Golden Helmet
 2013 -  Rawicz - Winner (13 pts)
 Polish Silver Helmet (U-21)
 2008 -  Rzeszów - Winner (12 pts)
 2009 -  Częstochowa - Runner-up (12+3 pts)
 Polish Bronze Helmet (U-19)
 2008 -  Gdańsk - 2nd place (12 pts)
 2009 -  Wrocław - Winner (15 pts)
 2010 -  Leszno - 2nd place (14 pts)

See also
 Poland national speedway team
 List of Speedway Grand Prix riders
 Speedway in Poland

References

Polish speedway riders
1991 births
Living people
Sportspeople from Wrocław
Team Speedway Junior World Champions
Team Speedway Junior European Champions
King's Lynn Stars riders
Poole Pirates riders